The State Defense Committee was an extraordinary organ of state power in the Soviet Union during the German-Soviet War, also called the Great Patriotic War, with complete state power in the country.

General scope
The Soviets set up the GKO on 30 June 1941, a week after Nazi Germany invaded the Soviet Union on 22 June 1941, by a joint decision of the Presidium of the Supreme Soviet of the Soviet Union, the Council of People's Commissars (Sovnarkom), and the Central Committee of the Communist Party of the Soviet Union. The war situation at the front lines required a more centralized form of government. The Supreme Soviet of the Soviet Union, however, continued unsuspended. On 18 June 1942, over a thousand members attended the 9th session of the Supreme Soviet in Moscow.

Geoffrey Roberts sees the GKO as "a sort of war cabinet".

Composition
The initial composition of the committee was such:
 Chairman - Joseph Stalin
 Deputy Chairman - Vyacheslav Molotov (until May 16, 1944)
 other members - Lavrentiy Beria, Kliment Voroshilov, Georgy Malenkov (Aviation Industry)

On February 3, 1942, the chairman of the Gosplan, Nikolai Voznesensky, as well as Anastas Mikoyan were made members of the committee, and on February 20, 1942 Lazar Kaganovich (Narkom of Transportation) was appointed as a member. On November 22, 1944, Nikolai Bulganin (Chairman of Gosbank) replaced Voroshilov in the committee.

See also
Council of Labour and Defence

References

Bibliography
Barber, John, and Harrison, Mark. (1991). The Soviet Home Front 1941–1945: A Social and Economic History of the USSR in World War II. London: Longman. , .
Werth, Alexander. (1964). Russia at War 1941–1945. New York: Carrol and Graf.

Further reading

Glantz, David M. When Titans Clashed: How the Red Army stopped Hitler. Lawrence, KS: University Press of Kansas, 1995.   Overview of Eastern Front from Soviet side.

Roberts, Geoffrey. Stalin's Wars: From World War to Cold War, 1939-1953. New Haven, CT: Yale University Press, 2006.    Post-revisionist study of Stalin's wartime and post-war leadership.

State Committees of the Soviet Union
1941 establishments in the Soviet Union
1945 disestablishments in the Soviet Union